The Great Indonesia Unity Party (PIR) was an Indonesian political party established in 1948. It was founded by a group of dissenters who broke away from the Indonesian National Party (PNI) because of their dissatisfaction with the PNI's increasingly left-wing stance. Its chairman was Wongsonegoro, governor of Central Java. The party aimed to be based on neither religion like the Masjumi or a western political outlook (like the PNI). Initially known as the PNI-Merdeka (PNI-Independent) it subsequently changed its name to the Great Indonesia Unity Party.

In 1954, following an internal dispute about whether the party should continue to serve in the cabinet, it split into two factions. In the 1955 Indonesian legislative election, the faction led by Wongsonegoro won 0.5 percent of the vote, while the faction led by Hazairin won 0.3 percent. Each faction was awarded one seat in the legislature, the People's Consultative Assembly.

Notes

References

 
 
 

Defunct political parties in Indonesia